Zachary Matthew Houston (born November 30, 1994) is an American professional baseball pitcher in the New York Yankees organization.

Career

Detroit Tigers
Houston attended Poplarville High School in Poplarville, Mississippi and played college baseball at Mississippi State University. In 2015, he played collegiate summer baseball with the Wareham Gatemen of the Cape Cod Baseball League.

He was drafted by the Detroit Tigers in the 11th round of the 2016 Major League Baseball Draft.

Houston signed with Detroit and spent his first professional season with the Connecticut Tigers and West Michigan Whitecaps, going a combined 2-0 with a 0.30 ERA in 20 relief appearances between both teams. He pitched 2017 with West Michigan and the Lakeland Flying Tigers where he pitched to a combined 0-1 record and 2.17 ERA in 58 total relief innings pitched. After the season he played in the Arizona Fall League. He started 2018 with the Erie SeaWolves and was promoted to the Toledo Mud Hens during the season.

New York Yankees
On December 4, 2022, Houston signed a minor league deal with the New York Yankees.

References

External links

1994 births
Living people
People from Slidell, Louisiana
Baseball players from Louisiana
Baseball pitchers
Mississippi State Bulldogs baseball players
Connecticut Tigers players
West Michigan Whitecaps players
Lakeland Flying Tigers players
Mesa Solar Sox players
Erie SeaWolves players
Toledo Mud Hens players
Wareham Gatemen players